Frêche may refer to:

Le Frêche, a municipality in the Landes department of south-west France
Georges Frêche (1938–2010), French politician

French-language surnames